Louis Poggi (born 18 June 1984) is a French professional footballer who plays as a midfielder for fifth-tier Championnat National 3 club Gazélec Ajaccio .

References

External links
Louis Poggi career statistics at foot-national.com

1984 births
Living people
Sportspeople from Bastia
French footballers
Association football midfielders
Gazélec Ajaccio players
SC Toulon players
Ligue 1 players
Ligue 2 players
Championnat National players
Corsica international footballers
FC Bastia-Borgo players
SC Bastia players
Footballers from Corsica